The 1918 Haverford Fords men's soccer team represented Haverford College during the 1918 ISFL season. It was the program's 18th season of existence, and their fourth under head coach, George Young.

The program won their eighth Intercollegiate Soccer Football League national title, and their first since 1915. Freshman Cornell Dowlin lead the Fords in scoring with six goals. Due to World War I, the Manheim Prize was not awarded.

Roster

Schedule 

|-
!colspan=6 style="background:#c91631; color:#FFFFFF; border:2px solid #000000;"| Regular season
|-

References

External links 
1904–05 Season Stats

Haverford
Intercollegiate Soccer Football League Championship-winning seasons
Haverford Fords men's soccer seasons
Haverford Fords men's soccer
Haverford